Libera Università Mediterranea (also LUM University or Free Mediterranean University) is an Italian private university founded in 1995, in Casamassima, Metropolitan City of Bari, Italy. The main building of the university is set in the industrial and directional center called "Baricentro", in Casamassima. Another institutional site, set in Gioia del Colle deals with Management School, Postgraduate Masters and Law Affairs. The University Campus is located near to the main building, inside the "Barialto" residence.

History
Lum Jean Monnet University was born in 1995 and then regularly recognised by the Educational and Research Ministry in 2000. In the 2004 has been established the LUM University School of Management, with postgraduate courses, and in the same year the Specialization School of Law Affairs has been established as well.

Rankings
According to the statistics annually reported by the La Repubblica's journal, the Lum Jean Monnet University, with its Economics and Law faculties, is located at the first place of southern Italy private universities. The data report a result of 87,4/110 for the Economics Department and 89,8/110 for Law.

Department and courses
Faculty of Economics
Bachelor's degree in economics and corporate governance with two possible specialization:
Banks, trade market and finance
Economics and management
MSc in economics and managements with three specialization:
Business advice and management
Corporate finance and banking
International management
Faculty of Law
Bachelor's degree in business law with two specialization:
Business lawyer
Public business administration
LL.M. in Law
School of Management
I Level MBA:
MAC - Auditing and control
MIGEM - General management
MACREF - MBA in corporate and real estate finance
MIREM2 - MBA in retail and marketing management
II Level MBA:
MADA - Environmental law
MADIS - Headmaster MBA
DEMAS - Law, economy and management in health business
Managerial education:
SM - Sales manager
CAMAS - High managerial education in sport management

Post lauream
Specialization School of Law Affairs
Training courses for professional mediators
Phd:
Economics and management of natural resources
General theory of trials: administrative, civil, criminal and tax

Internationalization
During the years, the university has quickly engaged a thick relationships and affiliations' network with foreign Universities and companies that is summarized in the following projects:

Partner Universities for the Exchange Student Erasmus Project - Faculty of Economics:
- France
Universitè de Paris IX - Dauphine
- Hungary
University of Miskolc
- Poland
Skarbek Graduate School of Business Economics - Varsavia
Wyzsza Szkola Bankowa - Wroclaw
- Spain
University of Lleida
Universidad Rey Juan Carlos - Mostoles
Universidad Europea Miguel de Cervantes - Valladolid
- Lithuania
Northern Lithuania College - Šiauliai
- Romania
Universitatea Petru Maior din Târgu Mureş

Partner Universities for the Exchange Student Erasmus Project - Faculty of Law:
- Spain
University of Lleida
Universidad Rey Juan Carlos - Mostoles
Universidad Europea Miguel de Cervantes - Valladolid
Universidad de Oviedo
- Romania
Universitatea Petru Maior din Târgu Mureş
- Lithuania
Northern Lithuania College - Šiauliai
- Hungary
University of Miskolc

Erasmus Placement:
Internship at the premises in London, Hastings, Valencia and Malta.

External links
University website

Universities in Italy
Metropolitan City of Bari
Educational institutions established in 1995
1995 establishments in Italy